See also Gubbängen metro station for the metro station.
Gubbängen is a suburban district in the southern part of Stockholm. The metro station was opened in 1950. Gubbängen is located in Farsta which is a borough (stadsdelsområde) in Söderort in the southern part of Stockholm Municipality. In Gubbängen lies City, a former cinema from the 1950s which currently hosts theatre plays, concerts, art exhibitions, film and occasionally also flea markets.

References

Districts of Stockholm